Lucien Theys (25 February 1927 – 19 January 1996) was a Belgian long-distance runner who competed in the 1948 Summer Olympics and in the 1952 Summer Olympics. He was the winner of the 1950 International Cross Country Championships.

References

1927 births
1996 deaths
Belgian male long-distance runners
Olympic athletes of Belgium
Athletes (track and field) at the 1948 Summer Olympics
Athletes (track and field) at the 1952 Summer Olympics
International Cross Country Championships winners